Bandar Tun Razak may refer to:
Bandar Tun Razak, town in Kuala Lumpur
Bandar Tun Razak (federal constituency), represented in the Dewan Rakyat
Bandar Tun Abdul Razak, Pahang, town in Pahang